The 1989 FIBA European Championship for Cadettes was the 8th edition of the European basketball championship for U16 women's teams, today known as FIBA U16 Women's European Championship. 12 teams featured in the competition, held in Timișoara, Romania, from 5 to 12 August 1989.

Czechoslovakia won their first and only title before their dissolution four years later. It was the first time that a team other than the Soviet Union won the title.

Participating teams

Preliminary round
In the Preliminary Round, the twelve teams were allocated in two groups of six teams each. The top two teams of each group advanced to the semifinals. The third and fourth place of each group qualified for the 5th-8th playoffs. The last two teams of each group qualified for the 9th-12th playoffs.

Group A

Group B

Playoffs

9th-12th playoff

5th-8th playoff

Championship playoff

Final standings

External links
Official Site

FIBA U16 Women's European Championship
1989–90 in European women's basketball
Bask
International youth basketball competitions hosted by Romania
International women's basketball competitions hosted by Romania